Richard Francis Bilda (May 17, 1919 – November 29, 1996) was an American football player. He was born in Milwaukee, Wisconsin in 1919. He attended the Marquette University High School, graduating in 1937. He is a member of the Marquette University High School Athletic Hall of Fame. A standout athlete in three sports, he later attended Marquette University, where he played football. In 1944 he was a member of the Green Bay Packers NFL Championship team when he played in three games. Bilda also played for the New York Giants.

References

External links

1919 births
1996 deaths
American football running backs
Marquette Golden Avalanche football players
Green Bay Packers players
New York Giants players
Players of American football from Milwaukee
Marquette University High School alumni